Lim Teck Yin  (born 24 December 1962) is a Singaporean public servant and former brigadier-general who has been serving as the chief executive officer of Sport Singapore since 2011. 

Throughout his career, Lim has been involved in competitive sports as he sought to further his primary job in the army. Lim is also a former national water polo player with seven Southeast Asian Games medals, and a recipient of the Singapore National Olympic Council Team of the Year Award for 1986, 1989 and 1991.

Lim was awarded the Public Administration Medal (Military) (Silver) in 2006, and the Public Administration Medal (Gold) in 2015 for his contributions to Singapore's sports sector.

Background
Lim was born in Singapore. His grandfather, Major-General Lim Bo Seng, was a former resistance fighter during World War II, and is regarded as a war hero in Singapore. Lim attended Anglo-Chinese School (Independent) and Anglo Chinese Junior College before graduating from the National University of Singapore with a Bachelor of Business Administration. He also holds a Master of Science in Management from the London Business School under the SAF Postgraduate Scholarship (General Development). Lim is a board member of the Anglo-Chinese Schools and the Anglo-Chinese School (Independent).

Career

Military career
Commissioned as an infantry officer in December 1981, Lim converted to a commando officer in September 1982 and was a platoon and company commander in the 1st Commando Battalion. Since then, he rose up the ranks holding various command and staff appointments notably as Commander of the Army Training and Doctrine Command and Commander of 6th Division. His final appointment in the SAF was Commandant of the SAFTI Military Institute. After his retirement from the SAF, Lim was redeployed as Deputy Division Commander of 9th Division, a role created for retired Brigadier-Generals. He was a former board member of the Temasek Defence Systems Institute, a subsidiary of the National University of Singapore.

Public service
Following his retirement from the SAF, Lim joined Sport Singapore on 1 April 2011 as its chief executive officer, scaling up its operations and strategic significance in the sports sector. Since then, he has gradually become a leading voice in the sports scene in Singapore as head of Sport Singapore as well as the chairman of the Singapore Southeast Asian Games organising committee, where he manages sporting activities and oversees key projects involving sports, sometimes taking rather tough views to put his point across. After the 2016 Rio Summer and Paralympics Olympics, Lim said that Sport Singapore would continue to optimize their resources to balance both high performance sport and those at the grassroots levels.

Personal life

Lim is married to Jane. They have four children.

Honours
 Public Administration Medal (Military) (Silver), in 2006.
 Public Administration Medal (Gold), in 2015.

References

External links 
 Sport Singapore Official Website

1962 births
Singaporean chief executives
National University of Singapore alumni
Anglo-Chinese School alumni
Alumni of London Business School
Living people
Singaporean male water polo players
Asian Games medalists in water polo
Water polo players at the 1986 Asian Games
Water polo players at the 1990 Asian Games
Asian Games bronze medalists for Singapore
Medalists at the 1986 Asian Games
Recipients of the Pingat Pentadbiran Awam